Liceo Ginnasio statale "Camillo Benso di Cavour" is the oldest Liceo classico in Turin and one among the oldest and most prominent high schools in Italy, for pupils aged 14 to 19. It was transferred to its present location in 1931.

History
It was founded in 1568 with the name of Collegio dei Nobili (it. for College of Nobles) by Emmanuel Philibert, Duke of Savoy, after he moved (1563) the capital of his States from Chambéry to Turin, and was assigned to Jesuits. For many centuries it has been the most prominent high school in the Duchy of Savoy and thereafter (from 1713) in the Kingdom of Sardinia. In 1787 the College moved from its older Palace (assigned later to Accademia delle Scienze and to Museo Egizio) to the Palace of the (suppressed) Convento del 
Carmine. It became a Lycée (on December 23, 1805) in Piedmont annexed to the First French Empire. At the fall of Napoleon I, King Victor Emmanuel I of Sardinia restored it as Collegio Reale Maggiore (Royal College) in 1818 and reassigned it to Jesuits. In 1848 after the First Italian War of Independence under King Charles Albert of Sardinia it was the first educational institution in the Kingdom to come under direct control of the State. The College became a Liceo classico in 1859 under the Law of Education of the Kingdom of Sardinia and courses began in 1860-1861; in 1865 the school was finally named after Camillo Benso, conte di Cavour; in these years (1861–1865) it was the leading high school of the capital of the united Kingdom of Italy. From 1911 to 1923 a Liceo Moderno was added to the Liceo classico. In 1931 the school moved to corso Tassoni, 15, in a new location, due to increasing numbers of students.

Teaching

The original curriculum (1568) concentrated on Rhetoric and Latin; later (from 1848) the emphasis was on classical studies, dominated by Latin and Classical Greek, and (with changes made in 1923 and later improvements in courses of study) it still emphasizes on Latin language (from first to fifth year) and Latin Literature (third to fifth year), Ancient Greek Language (first to fifth year) and Ancient Greek literature (third to fifth year), Humanities and Classics, although with the increasing support of sciences.

Liceo Cavour today
Liceo Cavour provides an exceptionally good quality of education, for which it has always been renowned in Turin. The school ranked first in the research made by the Fondazione Giovanni Agnelli and published in January 2009. By now it is a larger school than it has been for much of its history. In the 1870s there were about 350 boys; today they are about 930-950. Almost all of the school's pupils go to universities. In 2009-2010 the TV Series «Fuori classe» was partially filmed at the school (the fiction, about an Italian high school and its teachers and students, has been broadcast from January 2011, by the Italian state owned public service broadcaster RAI).

Alumni
Liceo Cavour has a long list of distinguished former pupils, including Luigi Einaudi, who served (1948–1955) as second President of the Italian Republic. Past pupils include the mathematician Giuseppe Peano, Agostino Richelmy, who served as Archbishop of Turin from 1897, and Cardinal of the Roman Catholic Church, the poet Guido Gozzano (for three years), Cesare Pavese (for three years), Ludovico Geymonat, Franco Venturi, Raf Vallone, and Livio Berruti, the surprising winner of the 200 m in the 1960 Summer Olympics

Bibliography
Golzio, Armando, Liceo Cavour. Progetto Educativo d'Istituto, 1996-1997 (Turin, Liceo Cavour, 1996), pages 9–19.
Kingdom of Sardinia, Law October 4, 1848, n. 819.
Kingdom of Sardinia, Law November 13, 1859, n. 3725.
Kingdom of Italy, Law March 4, 1865, n. 2229.
Martinengo, Maria Teresa, L'Università dà il voto alle scuole superiori. La ricerca promossa dalla Fondazione Agnelli. Il Cavour batte tutti. «La Stampa», 28 gennaio 2009.
Fondazione Agnelli - Graduatorie Scuole Piemonte ("effetto scuola").
Conti, Paolo,«Fuori classe»: con la prof Littizzetto alla scoperta della scuola pubblica. «Corriere della Sera», 15 agosto 2009.
Platzer, Tiziana, Al severo Cavour gli studenti giocano a fare il cinema. Nella scuola il set della fiction «Fuori classe». «La Stampa», 20 gennaio 2011.

See also 
 Liceo Classico

References

External links
 Liceo Cavour online. Official school website
 Liceo classico Cavour. Detailed information from Wikipedia. Italian edition
 Liceo classico. Detailed information from Wikipedia. Italian edition (the oldest schools)

Educational institutions established in the 1560s
Schools in Turin
Liceo classico
Kingdom of Sardinia
History of Turin
1859 establishments in Italy
1568 establishments in the Holy Roman Empire